Chlorotonil A is a polyketide natural product produced by the myxobacterium Sorangium cellulosum So ce1525.  It displays  antimalarial activity in an animal model, and has in vitro antibacterial and antifungal activity. The activity of chlorotonil A has been attributed to the gem-dichloro-1,3-dione moiety, which is a unique functionality in polyketides. In addition to its unique halogenation, the structure of chlorotonil A has also garnered interest due to its similarity to anthracimycin, a polyketide natural product with antibiotic activity against Gram-positive bacteria.

Biosynthesis
Chlorotonil A is synthesized from a type I modular polyketide synthase (PKS). This gene cluster does not have any acyltransferase (AT) domains, indicating that it is a trans-AT PKS; in these systems, there is a tandem-AT domain that loads the extender subunits onto the acyl carrier protein (ACP) and checks the intermediates, rather than individual AT domains in each module. The gene cluster of chlorotonil A is organized so that the initiator, acetyl-CoA, is loaded onto the tandem-AT domain, then is iteratively elongated with malonyl-CoA units to construct the macrolactone backbone. At modules 3 and 7, a double bond shift occurs in the elongation module to allow for the β,γ-unsaturation and α-methylation. There is a spontaneous, non-enzymatic intramolecular Diels-Alder-like [4+2] cycloaddition at module 8 to furnish the decalin motif.

Following macrolactonization by the thioesterase domain of module 10, the premature chlorotonil A core is chlorinated twice by CtoA, a flavin-dependent halogenase. The halogenated core is then methylated by the standalone SAM-dependent methyltransferase CtoF to yield chlorotonil A.

References

See also
Myxobacteria

Polyketides
Heterocyclic compounds with 3 rings
Oxygen heterocycles
Organochlorides